The 1964 United States presidential election in Pennsylvania took place on November 3, 1964, and was part of the 1964 United States presidential election. Voters chose 29 representatives, or electors to the Electoral College, who voted for president and vice president.

Pennsylvania overwhelmingly voted for the Democratic nominee, President Lyndon B. Johnson, over the Republican nominee, Senator Barry Goldwater. Johnson won Pennsylvania by a margin of 30.22%. Apart from William Howard Taft in 1912 when third-party candidates obtained substantial minorities of the vote, Goldwater's 34.7% of the vote is easily the worst showing for a Republican in the state since the party was founded. Even relative to Johnson's popular vote landslide, Pennsylvania came out as 7.64% more Democratic than the nation at-large; the only occasion under the current 2-party system that the state has been more anomalously Democratic than this was in Ronald Reagan's 1984 Republican landslide when Pennsylvania came out about 10% more Democratic than the US at-large. Despite this, this is the only time since Alaska's admission to the union in 1959 that Alaska voted to the left of Pennsylvania.

Johnson won all but four counties: the central Pennsylvania counties of Snyder and Union, which have not voted Democratic since the Civil War, northeastern border Wayne County, which has never voted Democratic since Grover Cleveland won it in 1892, and Lebanon County, which has only once voted Democratic since 1856 when Franklin Roosevelt won by 587 votes in 1936. This is the only occasion since 1856 when Lancaster County has not voted for the Republican presidential candidate, and was the first time since that election when suburban Delaware County had not voted Republican. 7 other counties – Somerset, Butler and the northern bloc of Bradford, Tioga, Potter, Cameron and McKean – also cast their solitary vote for a Democratic presidential candidate since at least the Civil War. In addition to these counties voting Democratic for the solitary occasion since the Civil War, a large bloc of Appalachia and adjacent areas – comprising York County, Cumberland County, Franklin County, Adams County, Blair County, Lycoming County, Northumberland County, Bedford County, Clarion County, Crawford County, Fulton County, Huntingdon County, Pike County, Venango County, Mifflin County, Perry County, Jefferson County, Susquehanna County, Wyoming County, Juniata County, Montour County, and Sullivan County – have never voted for a Democratic candidate since.

This was also the last occasion until Barack Obama in 2008 that the Democrats won Dauphin County, Berks County, Monroe County and Chester County. Within the more typically Democratic western and eastern peripheries Johnson won over 73% of the vote in Greene and Fayette Counties. As of the 2020 presidential election, this is also the last time that any county in Pennsylvania voted to the left of Philadelphia and the most recent time that Philadelphia was not the most Democratic county in the state.

Background
Ever since the Republican Party formed in 1854 to stop the spread of slavery into the territories, Pennsylvania had been a solidly Republican state apart from the industrial "Black Country" of the southwest, the urban core of Philadelphia County, and those areas which had not supported the Civil War, such as the northern part of the Pennsylvania Dutch Country and the northeastern Delaware Valley. The southwestern region, however, had come to make the state Democratic-leaning in the 1950s, although relative to national trends Pennsylvania trended Republican in 1960.

However, during the 1960s the GOP was turning its attention from the declining rural Yankee counties to the growing and traditionally Democratic Catholic vote, along with the conservative Sun Belt whose growth was driven by lower taxes, warm weather, and air conditioning. This growth meant that activist Republicans centred in the traditionally Democratic, but by the 1960s, middle-class Sun Belt had become much more conservative than the majority of members in the historic Northeastern GOP stronghold.

The consequence of this was that a bitterly divided Republican Party was able to nominate the staunchly conservative Senator Barry Goldwater of Arizona, who ran with the equally conservative Republican National Committee chair, Congressman William E. Miller of New York. The staunch conservative Goldwater was widely seen in the liberal Northeastern United States as a right-wing extremist; he had voted against the Civil Rights Act of 1964, and the Johnson campaign portrayed him as a warmonger who as president would provoke a nuclear war.

Goldwater wrote Pennsylvania off from the very beginning of his campaign, whilst local Republicans generally preferred moderate Governor William Scranton, who was encouraged to run (to no effect) by ex-President and former Gettysburg native Dwight D. Eisenhower. Many Pennsylvania Congressmen, notably James G. Fulton, refused to endorse Goldwater.

Results

Results by county

See also
 List of United States presidential elections in Pennsylvania

References

Pennsylvania
1964
1964 Pennsylvania elections